Neon Genesis Evangelion (新世紀エヴァンゲリオン, Shin Seiki Evangerion) is a Japanese multi-media anime franchise created by Japanese animator and filmmaker Hideaki Anno in 1994. Since 1997, there have been 7 theatrical film based on the franchise including the original trilogy produced by Gainax, directly following the original TV series, and later the Rebuild of Evangelion, a four-movie series made as a retelling of the Neon Genesis Evangelion series, made by Anno's own studio, Khara.

Original theatrical films

Neon Genesis Evangelion: Death & Rebirth 

Neon Genesis Evangelion: Death & Rebirth, is a 1997 Japanese animated science fiction psychological drama film and the first installment of the Neon Genesis Evangelion feature film project and consists of two parts. The project, whose overarching title translates literally to New Century Gospel: The Movie, was released in response to the success of the TV series and a strong demand by fans for an alternate ending. Its components have since been re-edited and re-released several times.

The first section, Evangelion:Death, is a 're-cap' editing together scenes from the first 24 episodes of Neon Genesis Evangelion in the form of a clip show, along with additional animation created after the show's original broadcast. This includes scenes from the original show re-drawn shot-for-shot, entirely new shots augmenting existing sequences, and linking segments based around the premise of the four main characters playing Pachelbel's Canon as a string quartet. Some of the additional shots and re-drawn animation would later be re-edited into the extended, 'Home Video Versions' of episodes 21–24 included on the Japanese VHS/Laserdisc and American and European Platinum Collection releases of the TV series, commonly known in the west as the "Director's Cut" versions though there is no clear substantiation of director Hideaki Anno's role in these. Death ends with credits accompanied by a double string quartet arrangement of Pachelbel's Canon.

Evangelion:Death(True) screened on the Japanese satellite TV channel WOWOW; this second cut of Evangelion:Death was re-edited by Masayuki, who held multiple creative roles throughout the franchise's production, removing some of the extra footage new to the feature. This was released on home video for the first time as part of the Archives of Evangelion DVD box set on August 26, 2015.

The second section, Evangelion: Rebirth, consists of approximately 24 minutes of entirely new animation that would eventually form the first third of the alternate ending film The End of Evangelion, released four months later as the second stage in the Neon Genesis Evangelion: Death & Rebirth project. Serving as a preview while End was still in production, Rebirth only covers the initial preparations of the Human Instrumentality Project and the invasion of the Geofront by the JSSDF, ending with the arrival of the Mass Production Evas. Because of its unfinished state, there are differences between Rebirth and the portion of the finished The End of Evangelion it covers. These differences include editing, shots that were later re-drawn entirely, and soundtrack cues that were replaced or further edited. The section ends with credits accompanied by the song Tamashii No Refrain by Yoko Takahashi.

The final stage of the New Century Gospel: The Movie project, a theatrical revival with the romanized title Revival of Evangelion was released on March 8, 1998, consisting of Death (True)² (a third, further edit of Death(True), with a few removed shots crucial to the plot edited back in) followed by a four-minute intermission and then the finished The End of Evangelion. In 2015, Revival was released on the Japanese Renewal of Evangelion Blu-ray box set along with End and the original theatrical cuts of Death and Rebirth.Death (True)² is also the version most widely released in the West, having been opted by Netflix and GKIDS for its distribution service and Blu-ray box set respectively. Death (True)² and End are separated in these Western releases, removing the intermission, but some campaigns have nevertheless collated the two under the banner Neon Genesis Evangelion: The Feature Film. The feature had a total gross of ¥1.87 billion.

The End of Evangelion 

The End of Evangelion is a 1997 Japanese anime science fiction film written by Hideaki Anno, directed by Anno and Kazuya Tsurumaki, and animated by Gainax and Production I.G. It serves as an alternate ending to the original series, in quite a similar way to the first movies.

The story follows the teenagers Shinji Ikari, Rei Ayanami and Asuka Langley Soryu, who pilot mechas called Evangelion to defeat enemies who threaten humanity named Angels. Shinji is subjected to the Human Instrumentality Project, a process in which human souls are merged into a single divine entity. The film features the voice actors of the original series, including Megumi Ogata as Shinji, Yuko Miyamura as Asuka, and Megumi Hayashibara as Rei.

Shortly before The End of Evangelion's release, Anno and Gainax released Neon Genesis Evangelion: Death and Rebirth. Like Death & Rebirth, the creators conceived The End of Evangelion as a duology comprising "Episode 25: Love Is Destructive" and "Episode 26: I Need You", remakes of the last two episodes of the original television series. In 1998, the overlapping films were edited together and reissued as Revival of Evangelion.

The End of Evangelion was a box-office success, grossing ¥2.47 billion. It was honoured at the Awards of the Japanese Academy, the Animation Kobe, and the 1997 Animage Anime Grand Prix, and was praised for its violence, direction, editing, emotional power, and script, though some reviewers criticized its oblique religious symbolism and abstraction.

Neon Genesis Evangelion: The End of Evangelion was released in Japanese theaters on July 19, 1997. Pre-sales began on May 17; customers with unused tickets for Death and Rebirth were permitted to use them for the movie. Viewers were given copies of the film's official poster. A preview was held on July 17 at Yomiuri Hall Cinema. In 1998, the feature films Death & Rebirth (1997) and The End of Evangelion (1997), partially overlapping, were merged by removing the part in common and re-released as Revival of Evangelion, which was released in theaters on March 7, attracting 300,000 people. In 2006, The End of Evangelion was screened as part of the Tokyo International Film Festival in Akihabara. In 2014, the Revival of Evangelion version was screened at Toho Cinemas in Nihonbashi during the 27th edition of the same festival. On August 28 and 29, 2015, to celebrate the release of the Blu-ray box set of the series, the film was played along with the first episode of Neon Genesis Evangelion ("Angel Attack") at Toho Cinema in Shinjuku, Tokyo. On December 4, 2020, it was announced a new run for Revival of Evangelion in special screenings across Japan between January 8 and 22, 2021.

In 1997, Neon Genesis Evangelion in Japan was at the center of national debates and became a social phenomenon. It thus attracted to theaters a large number of people who were intrigued by the controversy surrounding the original ending. The film version also drew the attention of newspapers, as well as people who were not normally interested in animation. The End of Evangelion's audience exceeded that of Death and Rebirth, drawing 400,000 viewers in the first three days of its release. The movie earned about one-and-a-half billion yen in Japanese distributor rentals, equivalent to about $12 million at the time, becoming the fourth-highest-grossing Japanese feature film of 1997. Hayao Miyazaki's Princess Mononoke, which also has mature and violent themes, was released in theaters at the same time as The End of Evangelion; Japanese media were attracted by the contrast between the two films' posters, one of which said "Live!" and The End of Evangelion which reported the line "Wouldn't it be nice if everyone would just die?".

Rebuild of Evangelion 
Rebuild of Evangelion, known in Japan and on Amazon Prime Video as Evangelion: New Theatrical Edition (ヱヴァンゲリヲン新劇場版, Evangerion Shin Gekijōban), is a Japanese animated film series and a retelling of the original Neon Genesis Evangelion anime television series, produced by Studio Khara. Hideaki Anno served as the writer and general manager of the project, with Kazuya Tsurumaki and Masayuki directing the films themselves. Yoshiyuki Sadamoto, Ikuto Yamashita and Shirō Sagisu returned to provide character designs, mechanical designs and music respectively.

The film tetralogy uses digital ink and paint, some 3D CG animation, and provides new scenes, settings and characters, with a completely new conclusion in the fourth and final film. Another stated intention of the series is for it to be more accessible to non-fans than the original TV series and films were. It was made to present an alternate retelling of episodes 1–19 of the TV series (including new scenes, settings, and characters) and a completely new conclusion to the story. The first film Evangelion: 1.0 You Are (Not) Alone was released in Japan on September 1, 2007, with Evangelion: 2.0 You Can (Not) Advance and Evangelion: 3.0 You Can (Not) Redo released on June 27, 2009, and November 17, 2012, respectively. The final film, Evangelion: 3.0+1.0 Thrice Upon a Time, was released on March 8, 2021.

Evangelion: 1.0 You Are (Not) Alone 

Evangelion: 1.0 You Are (Not) Alone. is a 2007 Japanese animated science fiction action film, written and chiefly directed by Hideaki Anno. It is the first installment of the tetralogy. The story, which is set in the futuristic city of Tokyo-3 fifteen years after a planetary catastrophe known as the Second Impact, focuses on Shinji Ikari, a boy who is recruited by the special agency Nerv to pilot a giant mecha known as an Eva unit and fight, along with fellow pilot Rei Ayanami, against a mysterious species named Angels. The film features the same cast of voice actors from the original series and previous movies, including Megumi Ogata as Shinji Ikari, Megumi Hayashibara as Rei Ayanami, and Kotono Mitsuishi as Misato Katsuragi. Hideaki Anno was joined in the direction by Kazuya Tsurumaki and Masayuki, both of whom were assistant directors of the original series. The storyboards were handled by Shinji Higuchi and Tomoki Kyoda.

The film, which retraces the plot of the first six episodes of the series, enjoyed a positive reception in Japan, grossing about two billion yen and generating considerable revenue for the home video market. Abroad, Evangelion: 1.0 received a more polarized reception, although generally positive; critics described it as too derivative of the classic series and claimed that it cut important details, while others praised its direction, soundtrack, and plot, with particular attention to its use of CGI graphics. The feature film also won accolades, receiving awards at, among others, the Animation Kobe and Tokyo International Anime Fair.

Hideaki Anno was assisted in the direction of You Are (Not) Alone by Masayuki and Kazuya Tsurumaki, who were assistant directors on Neon Genesis Evangelion. At the beginning of production, Anno asked Tsurumaki what he would like to do after finishing Diebuster between working on an Evangelion-related project, or on a new project about a famous anime. While confused by the question, he instinctively answered Evangelion. If Tsurumaki had refused, Anno was prepared to offer the role of assistant director to someone else, but Tsurumaki eventually accepted, albeit with reservations. Tsurumaki had regrets about the sixth episode of Neon Genesis Evangelion, "Rei II", which after the storyboard "was ordered by another company, and Gainax had no control over it", and felt he could address the issues he had with the episode. Meanwhile, Ōtsuki contacted Masayuki in February 2006. Like with the theatrical release of 1997, Masayuki was originally working on just the layout and helping with animation; however, Khara quickly promoted him to assistant director, since Tsurumaki alone could not do all the work within the production schedule.

Newtype, a Japanese pop culture magazine, claimed that Evangelion 1.0 "was greeted with the highest praise and acclaim of 2007". Matthew Roe of Anime News Network reported that the film received considerable positive feedback from fans and critics, eventually becoming one of the most praised and highest-grossing Japanese animated films of that year. Japanese critics welcomed and reviewed the feature film positively, putting emphasis on its visuals. The website Cinemarche praised the city of Tokyo-3 and the Evangelion weapons depicted in CG, describing them as "powerful images that have never been experienced before".

Evangelion: 2.0 You Can (Not) Advance 

Evangelion: 2.0 You Can (Not) Advance is a 2009 Japanese animated science fiction action film directed by Kazuya Tsurumaki andMasayuki, and written by Hideaki Anno. It is the second movie of the tetralogy. The film continues the story of Evangelion: 1.0 You Are (Not) Alone, with Shinji Ikari continuing his role as a pilot of one of the gigantic Evangelion as part of NERV's ongoing fight against the mysterious creatures known as Angels. While replicating many scenes and plot elements from the original series, the film also introduces new ones, including newly designed creatures and new characters, such as Mari Illustrious Makinami, and integrates newly available 3D CG technology. Its ending paves the way for the significant storyline departures from the original series in Evangelion: 3.0 You Can (Not) Redo.

In September 2006, it was confirmed the second film produced as part of the Rebuild of Evangelion series, with a release date tentatively set for January 2008 and a 90-minute running time. In November 2006, the December edition of the Japanese anime magazine Newtype confirmed the second film was written during post-production on the first film. Anno stated the introduction of new characters and Evangelion units would begin from the second film onwards. The release date was pushed back several times from the original announcement of January 2008: first, to a December 2008 release before an update on the official website on October 6, 2008, announced the official English title and an "early summer 2009" release date. A final postponement revealed that the film would be released on June 27, 2009.
Evangelion 2.0 made its International/US premiere at the Hawaii International Film Festival on October 24, 2009. The film made its Canadian premiere at Waterloo Festival for Animated Cinema on November 21, 2009. On December 3, 2009, the film was released in Hong Kong and South Korea. In Australia, the film made its premiere at the Reel Anime Festival in September 2010. The film premiered in Ireland on March 20, 2010, as a part of the Irish Film Institute Anime Weekend. The film screened on July 10, 2010, as a part of the Fantasia Film Festival in Montreal. The film made its European premiere at Lucca Comics 2009 on November 1, 2009 and was screened at the Asia Filmfest in Munich on November 6, 2009. Despite former announcements, Evangelion: 2.0 You Can (Not) Advance was not screened at the Animotion festival in Bonn because of licensing problems. The film also competed in the Sitges Film Festival in Catalonia, Spain on October 4, 2009, in the Anima't category. In North America, Cinema Asia Releasing, Eleven Arts and Funimation announced that Evangelion: 2.0 You Can (Not) Advance would premiere in the United States in January 2011. It was originally planned to premiere in 70–100 theaters. However, Funimation released a statement in December 2010 confirming that it would be released in 22 theatres.

In its opening weekend in Japan, the film reached number-one at the box office with a revenue of ¥510 million. The film subsequently grossed ¥4 billion ($43 million) at the Japanese box office in 2009, making it the year's second highest-grossing anime film. A 2020 Japan re-release grossed $433,850, totaling $43,433,850 grossed in Japan. The film's North American box office take was over $130,000, an improvement over 1.0. The film grossed $858,409 overseas by 2011, and a further $47,103 in Australia and New Zealand in 2017, for an overseas total of $905,512, bringing the film's worldwide box office gross to $44,339,362

Evangelion: 3.0 You Can (Not) Redo 

Evangelion: 3.0 You Can (Not) Redo. is a 2012 Japanese animated science fiction action film written and chief directed by Hideaki Anno and the third of the four films released in the Rebuild series. It was produced and co-distributed by Anno's Studio Khara and released in Japanese theaters on November 17, 2012. It was followed by the final film in the series,Evangelion: 3.0+1.0 Thrice Upon a Time, in 2021.

14 years have passed since the end of the second film, Asuka and Mari are in charge of recovering the Tesseract in which Unit 01 is sealed, when they are intercepted by the self-defence system in charge of preventing anyone from recovering the Eva. Back inside Unit 01, Shinji realizes that a lot has changed, he is now considered a criminal, held captive by his former Nerv allies who now form the Wille organization, whose unofficial goal is to destroy Nerv and prevent further impacts. Unable to find Rei Ayanami, Shinji learns that she has disappeared before being rescued by a new Rei clone and the Evangelion Mark-09. Back at Nerv HQ, he is greeted by his father who orders him to pilot Unit 13 with a co-pilot: Kaworu Nagisa. During his wandering, Shinji learns the result of his actions, the truth about his mother and about Ayanami. This is the moment Kaworu chooses to present him with his plan to cancel the third impact, but which will ultimately lead to the catastrophe of the fourth impact.

The film was released in Korean theaters in April 2013. The Japanese Blu-ray and DVD were released on April 24, 2013. The film is licensed by Funimation (North America), Madman Entertainment (Australia) and Manga Entertainment (United Kingdom) for home release on Blu-ray and DVD. The US announcement was revealed once their Facebook page reached over 1 million likes and was later provided with a release date for February 2014. However, due to more demand on theatrical screenings the home release was delayed. After numerous months with lack of information regarding both the theatrical release and home release, a FUNimation post on Facebook assured fans that they were working closely with Studio Khara to ensure the English dub is closer to Khara's vision. As a result, both the Australian and United Kingdom releases (both originally given a March 2014 release date) were postponed until the situation was sorted. In December 2014, Funimation confirmed that they intended to release Evangelion 3.33 in the near future and that Khara was creating the English-language subtitle track for the Western release of the film.

The film was released in Japan on November 17, 2012. It earned Japan's second-highest weekend box office of 2012 with ¥1,131,004,600 ($13,913,200). The film subsequently grossed ¥5,267,373,350 ($66,015,081) in Japan by the end of 2012. A 2020 Japan re-release grossed $433,850, totaling $66,448,931 grossed in Japan.

Overseas, the film grossed ₩441,165,211 ($402,945) in South Korea, $208,699 in Hong Kong and Thailand, $174,945 in the United States and Canada, and $47,103 in Australia and New Zealand, for an overseas total of $833,692. This brings the film's worldwide box office gross to $67,282,623.

References

External links 
 "Neon Genesis Evangelion: Every Movie In The Franchise (In Chronological Order)" at CBR.com
 Official Website
 Unofficial IMDB List at IMDB.com

Film series introduced in 1997
Neon Genesis Evangelion films
Neon Genesis Evangelion lists
Hideaki Anno
Gainax
Khara
Anime film series
Lists of films based on manga
Lists of Japanese films